Rapp is a surname. Notable people with the surname include:

Adam Rapp (born 1968), American novelist
Alfred Rapp (1933–2011), German politician
Anders Rapp (1927–1998), Swedish geomorphologist
Anthony Rapp (born 1971), American stage and film artist
Barbara Rapp (born 1972), Austrian artist
Bernard Rapp (1945–2006), French film director and television news presenter
C. J. Rapp, American beverage inventor
Danny Rapp (1941–1983), American musician
Elizabeth Farrow Rapp (1926–2010), All-American Girls Professional Baseball League player
Emily Susan Rapp (born 1974), American author and academic
George Rapp (1757–1847), pietist, German-American religious leader of the Harmony Society
Jean Rapp (1771–1821), French lieutenant general
Karl Friedrich Rapp (1882–1962), German engineer, founder of Rapp Motorenwerke GmbH
Katharina Rapp (born 1948), German artist
Larry Rapp (born 1948), American actor
Lea Bayers Rapp (born 1946), American non-fiction writer
Marcello Rapp, better known as "Cello Dias", bass guitarist for Against All Will
Mitch Rapp, fictional character
Nicki Rapp (born 1972), American video game voice actress
Nicolai Rapp (born 1996), German footballer
Peter Rapp (born 1983), German long jumper
Philip Rapp (1907–1996), film and television director and screenwriter
Ray Rapp (born 1945), a Democratic member of the North Carolina General Assembly
Reneé Rapp (born 2000), American actress and singer
Richard Rapp, former New York City Ballet dancer
Siegfried Rapp (1915–1982), German one-handed classical pianist
Taylor Rapp (born 1997), American football player
Tom Rapp (1947–2018), American singer-songwriter
Torsten Rapp (1905–1993), Swedish Air Force general
Vern Rapp (1928–2015), Major League Baseball manager and coach
 Valentin Rapp (born 1992), German squash player

See also
Rapp and Rapp, an architectural firm

German-language surnames